Wouter Vaes (born 9 February 1991) is a Dutch professional darts player who plays in British Darts Organisation (BDO) tournaments.

Career
Vaes' professional career started in the 2009 Sunparks Masters, where he finished among the Last 64. Since then he has competed in numerous tournaments and competitions, and have made it to several quarter finals and semi finals. He has made it to a single final round, in the 2016 Austria Open Vienna tournament, in which he lost against Robert Allenstein.

Despite never winning a tournament in his career, Vaes qualified for the 2017 BDO World Darts Championship, where he lost 0-3 to Darryl Fitton. 

His first tournament win was the 2018 edition of the Antwerp Open where he beat Mario Vandenbogaerde 7-5 in the final.

World Championship results

BDO
 2017: 1st Round (lost to Darryl Fitton 0–3)
 2019: Preliminary Round (lost to Roger Janssen 0-3)

References

External links
 Profile at Darts Database

Dutch darts players
1991 births
Living people
British Darts Organisation players